Malte Nieweler (born 10 April 1994) is a German footballer who plays as a forward for SuS Neuenkirchen.

Career
Nieweler made his professional debut for VfL Osnabrück in the 3. Liga on 25 March 2014, coming on as a substitute in the 65th minute for Pascal Testroet in the 0–1 away loss against Wehen Wiesbaden.

References

External links
 Profile at DFB.de
 Profile at kicker.de
 VfL Osnabrück statistitcs at Fussball.de
 SuS Neuenkirchen statistitcs at Fussball.de
 SuS Neuenkirchen II statistitcs at Fussball.de

1994 births
Living people
People from Steinfurt (district)
Sportspeople from Münster (region)
Footballers from North Rhine-Westphalia
German footballers
Association football forwards
VfL Osnabrück players
FC Viktoria Köln players
Sportfreunde Siegen players
3. Liga players
Regionalliga players
21st-century German people
FC Eintracht Rheine players